Mualim (معلم) is an Arabic word for teacher. It can refer to:

 Al-Mualim, a character in the Ubisoft videogame Assassin's Creed
 Al-Muʽallim, a compilation album by Sami Yusuf
 Mualim (District), the eleventh district in Perak, Malaysia
 Mualim Island, a small island in  group of Duke of York Islands in the Bismark Archipelago, Papua New Guinea